Statue of Juan de Oñate may refer to:

 Equestrian statue of Juan de Oñate (Alcade, New Mexico)
 Statue of Juan de Oñate (Albuquerque, New Mexico)